Břeclav District is a district in the South Moravian Region of the Czech Republic. Its capital is the town of Břeclav.

Administrative division
Břeclav District is divided into three administrative districts of municipalities with extended competence: Břeclav, Hustopeče and Mikulov.

List of municipalities
Towns are marked in bold and market towns in italics:

Bavory -
Boleradice -
Borkovany -
Bořetice -
Břeclav -
Březí -
Brod nad Dyjí -
Brumovice -
Bulhary -
Diváky -
Dobré Pole -
Dolní Dunajovice -
Dolní Věstonice -
Drnholec -
Hlohovec -
Horní Bojanovice - 
Horní Věstonice -
Hrušky -
Hustopeče -
Jevišovka -
Kašnice -
Klentnice -
Klobouky u Brna -
Kobylí -
Kostice -
Křepice -
Krumvíř -
Kurdějov -
Ladná -
Lanžhot -
Lednice -
Mikulov -
Milovice -
Moravská Nová Ves -
Moravský Žižkov -
Morkůvky -
Němčičky -
Nikolčice -
Novosedly -
Nový Přerov -
Pavlov -
Perná -
Podivín -
Popice -
Pouzdřany -
Přítluky -
Rakvice -
Šakvice -
Sedlec -
Šitbořice -
Starovice -
Starovičky -
Strachotín -
Tvrdonice -
Týnec -
Uherčice -
Valtice -
Velké Bílovice -
Velké Hostěrádky -
Velké Němčice -
Velké Pavlovice -
Vrbice -
Zaječí

Geography

Břeclav District borders Austria in the south and Slovakia in the southeast. The territory of the district is predominantly lowland and belongs to the warmest areas in the country. The territory extends into five geomorphological mesoregions: Lower Morava Valley (most of the territory), Mikulov Highlands (southwest), Dyje–Svratka Valley (west), Ždánice Forest (north) and Kyjov Hills (small part in the northeast).

The longest river in the area is the Morava, which forms the Czech-Slovak border. However, the most important river for the district is the Thaya, which flows across the territory from northwest to south and briefly forms the Czech-Austrian border before the confluence with the Morava. The Svratka crosses the district in the northwest, otherwise there are no major rivers in the northern part of the district.

Most of the Nové Mlýny reservoirs lie in the district and are the largest body of water of the district. On the Včelínek River is a system of several large ponds, including Nesyt, which belongs to the largest ponds in the country.

Pálava Protected Landscape Area is a protected area that lies entirely in the district.

Demographics

Most populated municipalities

Economy
The largest employers with its headquarters in Břeclav District and at least 500 employers are:

Transport
The D2 motorway from Brno to Czech-Slovak border, which is part of the European route E65, leads across the district.

Sights

The village of Lednice–Valtice Cultural Landscape was designated a UNESCO World Heritage Site in 1996 because of its unique mix of Baroque, Neolassical, and neo-Gothic architecture, and its history as a cultural landscape designed intentionally by a single family.

The most important monuments in the district, protected as national cultural monuments, are:
Lednice Castle
Valtice Castle
Dolní Věstonice archaeological site
Pavlov archaeological site
Vineyard house No. 145 in Pavlov
Svatý Kopeček Hill in Mikulov with the pilgrimage chapel of St. Sebastian

The best-preserved settlements and landscapes, protected as monument reservations and monument zones, are:
Břeclav-Pohansko (monument reservation)
Mikulov (monument reservation)
Lednice–Valtice Cultural Landscape (monument reservation)
Pavlov (monument reservation)
Valtice (monument zone)

The most visited tourist destinations are Svatý Kopeček Hill and Lednice Castle.

References

External links

Břeclav District profile on the Czech Statistical Office's website

 
Districts of the Czech Republic